Diminio is a village in the municipality Sikyona, Corinthia, Greece. It is situated near the coast of the Gulf of Corinth.

Transport

Rail 
Diminio train station is currently open but will be serviced by the Proastiakos in the near future. Currently the nearest railway station serviced by the Proastiakos is Kiato railway station in the nearby town of Kiato.

References

Populated places in Corinthia